Manmadhan is the God of love in Hindu mythology

Manmadhan may refer to:

 Manmadhan (film), a 2004 Indian Tamil film starring Silambarasan and Jyothika 
 Manmadhan Ambu, a 2010 Indian Tamil film starring Kamal Hassan, R. Madhavan and Trisha